Ricky Sudale (born 29 May 1966) is an English professional darts player who has played in Professional Darts Corporation events.

Sudale qualified for the 2013 European Darts Trophy on the PDC European Tour, but lost his first round match to Robert Thornton of Scotland.

References

External links

English darts players
1966 births
Living people
Professional Darts Corporation associate players